William Smith (1893 – October 1958) was a South African cyclist. He won the Silver Medal in Tandem and a Bronze in the 4000m Team Pursuit Men in the 1920 Summer Olympics.

References

1893 births
1958 deaths
South African male cyclists
Olympic cyclists of South Africa
Cyclists at the 1920 Summer Olympics
Olympic silver medalists for South Africa
Olympic bronze medalists for South Africa
Olympic medalists in cycling
Medalists at the 1920 Summer Olympics
19th-century South African people
20th-century South African people